Rhénus Sport (originally Hall Rhénus, also known as Rhénus Sport Arena and Arena de la SIG) is a multi-purpose arena located in Strasbourg, France. The seating capacity is 6,200 for basketball games. It is currently home to the professional French League club Strasbourg IG.

History
The arena opened around 1974. In 1981, the arena was the venue of the European Champions Cup Final, in which Maccabi Tel Aviv defeated Sinudyne Bologna 80–79. In February 2005, the Davis Cup match between France and Sweden took place in this arena. In 2014, the venue hosted the European Fencing Championships. In 2016, it hosted the Fed Cup final.

On April 3, 2009, USA President Barack Obama spoke to a French and German crowd at the arena, while the President was in Stasbourg for the 2009 Strasbourg-Kehl summit.

In 2018, it was announced the arena would undergo major renovations, beginning in summer 2019. Renovations will include expanding the arena's capacity to 8,071 in the first phase. The project is estimated to cost 40 million euros. Naming rights have been secured by Crédit Mutuel. The project was estimated to be completed by summer 2021, opening as the Crédit Mutuel Forum. However, due to the coronavirus pandemic, completion end in 2023.

External links

Info from the web site of Strasbourg

References

Indoor arenas in France
Basketball venues in France
Buildings and structures in Strasbourg
SIG Strasbourg
Sports venues in Strasbourg